Victor Emilio Ramírez (born March 30, 1984) is an Argentine former professional boxer. He held the WBO cruiserweight title in 2009 and the IBF cruiserweight from 2015 to 2016. Ramírez announced his retirement in December 2016. He fought once at heavyweight in December 2017.

Professional career

Early career 
Ramírez made his professional boxing debut at the age of 22 as a heavyweight on April 8, 2006, against 32-year-old Miguel Angel Pacheco at the Estadio Luna Park in Buenos Aires, Argentina. Ramírez won the fight via unanimous decision after four rounds. Ramírez then fought three times in the space of five months at the Club El Porvenir in San Miguel del Monte, Buenos Aires winning all fights inside the distance against Roberto Martinez, Jose Norberto Gomez and Mario Javier Moreno. Ramírez suffered his first defeat on his 7th fight in December 2006 against Sebastian Ignacio Ceballos via majority decision with judges scores of 56–59, 56–57 and 57½–57½.

Ramírez took six months out before returning in June 2007 against Claudio Carlos Roque Fernandez, who outweighed Ramírez by over 100 pounds. In a scheduled six round bout, the fight ended as no contest in round two as the ring crumbled by the weight of the boxers and the referee. Over the next year, Ramírez racked up a five fight win streak before winning his first title at cruiserweight against Mauro Adrian Ordiales (20–4, 19 KOs), retiring him after 11 rounds. Ramírez claimed the vacant South American cruiserweight title with the win. His next fight in December 2008, Ramírez retained the title and won the vacant WBO Latino cruiserweight title with a 2nd round knockout off Hector Ricardo Sotelo. Sotelo was down twice in the 1st round & once in the 2nd round.

WBO cruiserweight champion

Ramírez vs. Alekseyev 
Ramírez fought the undefeated Aleksandr Alekseyev (16–0, 15 KOs) at the Burg-Waechter Castello in Düsseldorf, Germany, on January 17, 2009, for the vacant interim WBO world cruiserweight title. Alekseyev entered as the WBO # 2 cruiserweight contender, while Ramírez entered as the WBO # 7 cruiserweight contender. Alekseyev's corner threw in the towel after round 9, giving Ramírez his first world title.

Ramírez vs. Ismailov 
Ramírez was promoted to full title holder and made his first defence against 35 year old Ali Ismailov in May 2009 in his native Argentina. In a fight were no knockdowns occurred, Ramírez retained his world title via split decision. Two judges scored it for Ramírez at 116–112 and 115–113 and one judge had it for Ismailov 115–113.

Ramírez vs. Huck 
It was announced that Ramírez would make his second defence on August 29, 2009, against former IBF world title challenger Marco Huck (25–1, 20 KOs) at the Gerry Weber Stadium in Germany. Huck won the WBO cruiserweight title via a unanimous decision with two judges scoring it 116–111 and the third judge scoring it 115–112. Huck had a point deducted in round 12 following repeated low blows. Ramírez loudly disapproved of Huck claiming victory when the final bell sounded, and disagreed with the verdict. Huck went on to defend the title a record equalling 13 times.

Comeback in 2013 
Ramírez returned to boxing at the age of 28 in December 2013 in Argentina against Thabiso Mogale (14–13–2, 9 KOs) in a scheduled four round fight, winning via first round knockout.

IBF Latino cruiserweight 
In his next fight in January 2014, Ramírez won a 10 round unanimous decision (100–90, 100–90, 98–92) to win the vacant IBF Latino cruiserweight title. Ramírez successfully defended the title four times in 2014, winning all the fights inside the distance. At the end of 2014, his record was 21 wins, 2 losses with 17 wins by way of knockout.

IBF cruiserweight champion

Ramírez vs. Afolabi 
With successive defences of the Latino title, Ramírez climbed the IBF rankings earning him a fight for the interim IBF cruiserweight title against Ola Afolabi (21–3–4, 10 KOs). The fight took place on April 10, 2015, at the Villa La Ñata Sporting Club in Benavídez, Buenos Aires, Argentina. The winner would then go on to fight IBF champion Yoan Pablo Hernandez, who was nursing an elbow injury. They went the full 12 round distance as Ramírez became a two time world champion with the judges scoring it 115–111, 115–111 and 116–111 in his favour. Afolabi appeared to win the seventh and ninth rounds, and perhaps the tenth, outworking Ramírez technically to some degree. After issuing Afolabi two warnings for low blows, referee Pete Podgorski penalized Afolabi two points in the eleventh round for a flagrant low blow. Without the two point deduction, Afolabi had to win one more round for the fight to end in a majority draw.

Promoted to full champion 
In June 2015, it was finally announced that Ramírez would fight full IBF champion Yoan Pablo Hernandez in Argentina on July 25. The fight was postponed to a future date in September. In September, Ramírez was made full titleholder after the IBF stripped Hernandez, declining him a chance to reschedule the fight for a second time. Hernandez hadn't defended the title in 13 months.

Ramírez vs. McKenzie 
On September 22, it was confirmed that Ramírez would make his first defence of his IBF title against journeyman Ovill McKenzie (25–12, 13 KOs) on October 2 in Buenos Aires. McKenzie was on a four fight unbeaten run. Ramírez retained his world title after the fight ended in a split decision draw after 12 rounds in a fight many thought McKenzie had done enough to win. Promoter Frank Warren said he believed McKenzie deserves an immediate rematch. In the post fight interviews, McKenzie said, "The only thing that's bruised on me is my hands and my faith in the IBF." One judge had the fight 114–114, while the other two had it 115–113 for either fighter.

Ramírez vs. Lebedev 
Following the draw against McKenzie, Ramírez quickly began pursuing a unification match against WBA champion Denis Lebedev. It was announced the fight would take place on April 20, 2016, in Moscow. The fight was later rescheduled for May 21 and supposed to be a co-feature with WBC heavyweight title fight between Deontay Wilder and Alexander Povetkin, until it was cancelled when Povetkin tested positive for drugs. Ramírez was no match for Lebedev in losing in just two rounds. Lebedev put Ramírez down in the 2nd round after a fairly even first round. Lebedev finished Ramírez off with a flurry of shots that had him turning his back to Lebedev at one point before it was halted. The fight was stopped at 1:57 of the round by referee Steve Smoger.

Temporary retirement 
On December 27, 2016, Ramírez announced his retirement from boxing. Citing that he no longer had motivation, "I do not want to come back to the ring to fight. I got tired of training and having to lose weight. No more."

Heavyweight 
Ramírez fought at the China show in Beijing, China on December 18, 2018 against undefeated Chinese heavyweight contender Zhang Junlong (17-0, 17 KOs). Junlong's WBA Oceania title was at stake. Zhang put Ramírez down twice with vicious body shots. He was badly hurt and never get up. Referee Ferlin Marsh stopped the one-sided fight at 1:36 in the opening round. This was the sixth WBA Oceania heavyweight title defence for Zhang, who knocked out all the challengers in one or two rounds.

Professional boxing record

References

External links

|-

|-

|-

|-

1984 births
Living people
People from Ezeiza, Buenos Aires
Argentine male boxers
Heavyweight boxers
Sportspeople from Buenos Aires Province